Emmanuelle Assmann, (born October 27, 1974) is a French wheelchair fencer and a sports leader. She was chair of the French Paralympic and Sports Committee.  She was awarded the Knight of the Legion of Honor, in 2013.

Career 
She competed at the 2004 Summer Paralympics in Athens, winning a bronze medal in women's épée team. She competed in Women's foil A, Women's foil team, and Women's épée A.

She works for EDF Sport Energie. She is a board member of the French Disabled Federation. She chaired the French Paralympic and Sports Committee (CPSF) from May 2013 to December 2018.

References

External links 

 Marie Amélie LE FUR, présidente du CPSF

1974 births
Living people
Paralympic wheelchair fencers of France
French female épée fencers
Paralympic bronze medalists for France
Wheelchair fencers at the 2004 Summer Paralympics
Medalists at the 2004 Summer Paralympics